Marina Gritsenko (born 17 August 1980) was a female water polo player of Kazakhstan. 

She was part of the Kazakhstani team at the 2011 World Aquatics Championships, 2012 Summer Olympics. and 2013 World Aquatics Championships in Barcelona, Spain.

See also
 Kazakhstan at the 2013 World Aquatics Championships

References

External links
Marina Gritsenko at Sports Reference
http://www.waterpoloplanet.com/HTML_link_pages/09_World_Championship_Women.html
http://www.swimnews.com/News/view/2487
http://www.zimbio.com/photos/Marina+Gritsenko/Women+Water+Polo+Day+Two+14th+FINA+World+Championships/nkQleV5b1OX
http://www.gettyimages.com/photos/marina-gritsenko?excludenudity=true&sort=mostpopular&mediatype=photography&phrase=marina%20gritsenko&family=editorial

Kazakhstani female water polo players
Living people
Place of birth missing (living people)
1980 births
Water polo players at the 2004 Summer Olympics
Olympic water polo players of Kazakhstan
Asian Games medalists in water polo
Water polo players at the 2010 Asian Games
Water polo players at the 2014 Asian Games
Asian Games silver medalists for Kazakhstan
Asian Games bronze medalists for Kazakhstan
Medalists at the 2010 Asian Games
Medalists at the 2014 Asian Games
21st-century Kazakhstani women